Caloptilia wakayamensis is a moth of the family Gracillariidae. It is known from Honshū island, Japan.

The wingspan is 10–11 mm.

The larvae feed on Acer palmatum. They probably mine the leaves of their host plant.

References

wakayamensis
Moths of Japan
Moths described in 1966